Jon Gerrard  (born October 13, 1947) is a politician in Manitoba, Canada.  He was a Member of Parliament (MP) from 1993 to 1997, and was a secretary of state in the government of Jean Chrétien. He was the leader of the Manitoba Liberal Party from 1998 until 2013, and the member of the Legislative Assembly of Manitoba for River Heights since 1999.

Early life and private career

Gerrard was born in Birmingham, England, and grew up in Saskatoon, Saskatchewan. He holds a Bachelor of Arts degree in economics from the University of Saskatchewan (1967), a Doctor of Medicine degree from McGill University (1971), a Doctor of Philosophy degree from the University of Minnesota (1976), and a Certificate in Pediatrics from the American Academy of Pediatrics (1976).  He worked at several prominent American institutions in the 1970s, and returned to Canada in 1980 to accept a position as pediatrician at the Winnipeg Children's Hospital.  Gerrard served as head of Pediatric Hematology/Oncology at this hospital from 1985 to 1992, and taught at the University of Manitoba from 1980 to 1993.  He has authored or co-authored over 200 scientific publications, and became known during the 1980s as an expert on the research and treatment of children's cancer.  Gerrard has also been interested in bald eagles since his teenaged years, and co-authored a book entitled The Bald Eagle: Haunts and Habits of a Wilderness Monarch in 1988. He has been studying eagles at Besnard Lake in Saskatchewan for 50 years.

Gerrard became active with the Liberal Party of Canada while working on his undergraduate degree, impressed with Prime Minister Lester Pearson's positions on social and international issues.  He was a delegate to the Liberal Party's 1968 leadership convention, supporting John Turner.  He later volunteered for the "Non" side in the 1980 Quebec referendum, and became Liberal riding president for Lisgar in 1984.  In 1990, he was Manitoba co-chair of Jean Chrétien's successful bid for the Liberal Party leadership.

Government minister

Gerrard was elected to the House of Commons of Canada in the 1993 federal election, defeating two-term Progressive Conservative incumbent Felix Holtmann in the riding of Portage—Interlake.  On November 4, 1993, he was appointed as Secretary of State for Science, Research and Development.  This was not a full cabinet portfolio, but was instead affiliated with Industry Canada.  Gerrard worked closely with Industry Minister John Manley, and oversaw the development of such programs as Technology Partnerships Canada, the Canadian Foundation for Innovation, and the Canada Research Chairs.

Internet and communications strategies

Gerrard outlined the Chrétien government's strategy for the burgeoning information highway in February 1994, as internet use increased throughout the country.  One of this strategy's goals was to "[put] Canada in cyberspace", by creating a "national network of networks" within the new media.  Gerrard indicated that his plan would be targeted toward creating jobs, reinforcing Canada's cultural identity, and ensuring universal internet access at affordable rates.  He officially launched an $80 million action plan on January 30, 1995, providing funding for online applications in the fields of business, research, health care and education.

In March 1994, Gerrard described the internet as "very much a Liberal technology in the sense that it is much more individual than collective".  Speaking to an interviewer in 2007, he said that the highlight of his political career was convincing the Chrétien government to include a reference to the information highway in its first throne speech.

Gerrard's 1994 strategic statement on the information highway also addressed the subject of industry mergers in the communications sector.  He indicated that the Chrétien government would "apply pro-competition policies wherever ... they make sense" and added:

Science and technology strategies

In June 1994, Manley and Gerrard ordered a full review of federal science and technology policy.  This process had three aspects: an internal review, an independent assessment from the National Advisory Board on Science and Technology, and a series of consultations with interested Canadians.  Gerrard personally supervised the review's consultative sessions, and was appointed as vice-chairman of the National Advisory Board.  The government's new strategy was issued in March 1996, outlining new plans for funding and tax credits.

The Chrétien government's approach to funding the science and technology sectors was given mixed reviews.  Some criticized the government for cutting a number of research and science positions during the recession of the early 1990s, although at least one technological journal credited it with maintaining research and development incentives in the austerity budget of 1995.  Gerrard himself was described a "passionate advocate" of research investment, and as the driving force behind the government's National Technology Investment Program of 1996.

Additional duties

Gerrard was given additional responsibilities as Secretary of State for Western Economic Diversification on January 25, 1996.  He oversaw the expansion of the Community Futures Development Corporation Network throughout Western Canada, and worked with Foreign Affairs Minister Lloyd Axworthy to ensure a secure transition of the Port of Churchill rail line from Canadian National to OmniTRAX.

Other

Gerrard voted in favour of the Chrétien government's national gun registry program in late 1994, despite some personal reservations.  The registry was unpopular with many rural Manitobans, and Gerrard remarked to John Manley soon after the vote that it would likely cost him his seat in the next election.

1997 election

The Portage—Interlake riding disappeared with redistribution before the 1997 election.  Gerrard ran in the new riding of Selkirk—Interlake, and lost to Reform Party candidate Howard Hilstrom by 66 votes in a very close three-way contest.

Gerrard returned to his work at the Winnipeg Children's Hospital after his defeat.  He also became a Medical Research Council of Canada scholar in residence at the University of Manitoba's medical school and applied to become Dean of Medicine, as well as returning to his research work on bald eagles.

Leadership of the Manitoba Liberal Party

Gerrard returned to active political life in 1998, as leader of the Manitoba Liberal Party.

After winning only three seats in the 1995 provincial election and losing its official status in the legislature, the provincial Liberal Party had nearly disintegrated in 1997 under the leadership of Ginny Hasselfield.  She resigned in February 1998, and Gerrard declared his candidacy to succeed her.  Supported by former leader Sharon Carstairs, he defeated the only other candidate, former Sagkeeng First Nation chief Jerry Fontaine.

Elections

1999

Gerrard set modest goals for his party in the 1999 provincial election, saying that the Liberals could win between ten and fifteen seats to hold the balance of power in a minority government.  He focused his attention on health care, and pledged that he would serve as his own Minister of Health if elected as Premier.  He also promised to appoint a health ombudsman, commit $25 million toward repairing provincial infrastructure, provide $20 million for post-secondary education, end provincial clawbacks of federal tax credits for welfare recipients, and create a new Ministry of Digital Economy and the Information Highway.

The Liberal Party was unable to run a full electoral slate, fielding candidates in only 50 of 57 divisions.  Gerrard tried to deflect criticism by joking that he would "put his 50 Liberal candidates up against 57 Tory and NDP candidates any day", but the failure to run a full slate unquestionably damaged his party's prospects.

On election day, Gerrard personally defeated incumbent Progressive Conservative cabinet minister Mike Radcliffe in the upscale Winnipeg division of River Heights, but the Liberals did not win any other seats.  The party's popular vote fell from 23% to 13%, as many former Liberal voters shifted to the victorious New Democratic Party under Gary Doer.

Gerrard was the only Liberal member of the Manitoba legislature between 1999 and 2003.  He was not personally blamed for the party's loss, and was reaffirmed as party leader in 2000.

2003

Popular support for the Liberal Party increased after the 1999 election, reaching 24% in July 2001 and remaining in the low twenties throughout 2002 and 2003.  The party entered the 2003 election in a much improved position from four years earlier: their divisions were largely resolved and their financial situation more secure, and they were able to field a candidate in every division.

Gerrard promised tax cuts for Manitobans under thirty and the elimination of the province's payroll tax, and committed to a "health-care guarantee" wherein the government would fund out-of-province health care if services could not be provided within Manitoba.  He also promised to create an organization that would integrate health services from different fields, and to establish community health centres for seniors.

Liberal support declined in the final stage of the campaign, and the party ultimately polled a slightly lower percentage of votes relative to its 1999 result.  Gerrard was nevertheless returned without difficulty in River Heights, and former Member of the Legislative Assembly (MLA) Kevin Lamoureux gave the party a second seat by retaking his old division of Inkster.

2007

The Liberal Party's 2007 campaign was centred around five issues: health care waiting lists, threatened emergency room closures in Winnipeg, university funding, urban sprawl, and the environmental state of Lake Winnipeg.  The Liberals also pledged to provide immediate funding for rapid-transit in Winnipeg, phase out the provincial payroll tax while reducing property taxes by as much as 30%, and introduce a new police unit to protect children from sexual exploitation.  The party also stressed an environmentally conscious image, purchasing carbon credits to run a carbon-neutral campaign.

Gerrard and Lamoureux were again returned to the legislature, but no other Liberals were elected and the party's popular vote slipped again to just under 12.5%.

Issues

Health care

Gerrard has remained involved with health issues throughout his time in the legislature.  In 2001, he protested the Doer government's decision to close an outpatient pharmacy at the Winnipeg Health Sciences Centre by bringing several families of child cancer patients to the legislature to confront the health minister.  He later called for changes to Manitoba's adult heart surgery program, after figures obtained through a freedom of information request showed an increasing number of fatalities.

Gerrard wrote a Winnipeg Free Press column criticizing the Doer government for health-care delays in 2005, and later argued that personal health information should be made more easily accessible to patients and their families.  He released a detailed document promoting change in Manitoba's health system in September 2007, highlighted by a call to make regional health authorities more accountable to citizens.

Agriculture and environment

Shortly after the 1999 election, Gerrard took part in an all-party delegation to Ottawa to lobby the federal government for a cash bailout for struggling western farmers.

In early 2004, Gerrard wrote a guest column in the Winnipeg Free Press calling on the federal government to test every beef and dairy cow over thirty months for Bovine spongiform encephalopathy (BSE).  This recommendation was made during a significant decline in the Canadian cattle market, after the discovery of a BSE-infected cow in Alberta caused the United States to block all Canadian cattle.

Also in 2004, Gerrard accused the Doer government of undermining its water-quality legislation by reducing funds for key programs.

Social issues

Gerrard holds liberal views on social issues.  He pressured the Doer government to legalize adoption rights for same-sex couples in 2001, one year before a comprehensive bill including adoption rights was passed by the legislature.

Gerrard took part in the Winnipeg Harvest Poverty Challenge in late 2002, and attempted to live for a full week on only $20.  The challenge was meant to draw attention to the difficulties faced by Manitoba's lowest-income residents, living on social assistance.

In 2003, Gerrard supported calls for a provincial smoking ban in workplaces and enclosed public spaces.

Other issues

In early 2005, Gerrard wrote that the Doer government had not taken proper steps to regulate the province's burgeoning internet pharmaceutical industry.  This industry was popular with American customers, and Gerrard's column was written at a time when the federal government was seeking to impose greater control over the sector.

In April 2007, Gerrard introduced a private member's bill entitled the Apology Act, to make apologies inadmissible in court as proof of liability or guilt.  The bill was modeled after similar legislation in British Columbia, and was intended to allow medical professionals to apologize to patients without risking legal charges.  It was passed into law with government support in November 2007, and formally took effect in February 2008.

Gerrard has also called for a public inquiry into the New Democratic Party government's alleged role in failing to prevent the financial collapse of the Crocus Investment Fund.  Following the 2007 election, he took part in an all-party delegation to Ottawa to argue for increased penalties against gang-related criminals and young car thieves.  He has also called for a public review of appointees to the Manitoba Hydro Board, and has requested a plebiscite on the location of a power line from northern to southern Manitoba.

In October 2007, he introduced a bill to ban retailers from using plastic bags by 2009.  He also criticized the Doer government's decision to build a Manitoba Hydro Power line on the west side of Lake Winnipeg, and called for the public to be directly consulted on the issue through non-binding referendums.

He called for a provincial moratorium on taser use in 2007, following increased concerns about its safety.

Other

Despite his background as a Chrétien supporter, Gerrard was reported to have endorsed Paul Martin's bid for the federal Liberal Party leadership in 2003.  He supported Gerard Kennedy's bid in 2006.

Gerrard released a history of the Manitoba Liberal Party in 2006, entitled Battling for a Better Manitoba.  A Winnipeg Free Press reviewer described the book as "a generally readable—though sloppy—account of one of the three provincial parties", adding that the book "perhaps should not have been published in its current state".

Electoral record

All electoral information is taken from Elections Canada and Elections Manitoba.  Provincial expenditures refer to candidate expenses.

References

External links

Jon Gerrard's blog

1947 births
Canadian pediatricians
Liberal Party of Canada MPs
Living people
Manitoba Liberal Party MLAs
Manitoba political party leaders
McGill University Faculty of Medicine alumni
Members of the 26th Canadian Ministry
Members of the House of Commons of Canada from Manitoba
Members of the King's Privy Council for Canada
University of Minnesota alumni
University of Saskatchewan alumni